Sergio Noja Noseda  (July 7, 1931January 31, 2008) was an Italian professor of Arabic language and literature and Sharia.

Life
Noja Noseda was born in Pola, the son of Ugo Noja and Rina Noja Amabile, descending from an ancient family of aristocratic origins  coming from Spain in the 16th century which eventually settled in Italy. After the High School  he attended the Bocconi University in Milan where he graduated in Economics. During this period he also served as president of the "Società della Taula" (The Bocconi University Senior Society). At the same time as he made a career in a private company, Philips Italia, which would carry him to the rank of director general, he always had a deep interest in oriental studies. He was directed and taught by Monsignor Giovanni Galbiati in the study of Arabic language. Having been first appointed Professor of Islamic law at the University of Turin, he later became Professor of  Arabic language and literature at the Università Cattolica del Sacro Cuore of Milan where he maintained the chair in Arabic language and literature for more than twenty years.

He died in a car accident in 2008, aged 76.

Bibliography

 Breve storia dei popoli arabi. Milano: A. Mondadori, 1997. 292 p.
 Storia dei popoli dell'Islàm. Milano: A. Mondadori.
 L'islàm dell'immobilismo: dalla caduta di Bagdàd allo sbarco di Napoleone in Egitto, 1258-1798. Milano: A. Mondadori, 1994. 356 p.
 L'Islam moderno: dalla conquista napoleonica dell'Egitto al ritiro dell'Armata Rossa dall'Afghanistan. Milano: Mondadori, 1990. 314 p.

External links
 Ricordo Di Sergio Noja Noseda
 Corriere Di Novara
 
 Prof. Sergio Noja-Noseda
 Corriere della Sera

People from Pula
2008 deaths
1931 births
Linguists from Italy
Road incident deaths in Italy
20th-century linguists